Whistle and I'll Come to You is a BBC television drama adaptation based on the 1904 ghost story 'Oh, Whistle, and I'll Come to You, My Lad' by writer M. R. James. The story tells the tale of an introverted academic who happens upon a strange whistle while exploring a Knights Templar cemetery on the East Anglian coast. When blown, the whistle unleashes a supernatural force that terrorises its discoverer. It was screened on BBC Two during the 2010 Christmas television season. The film was written by Neil Cross and directed by Andy de Emmony, stars John Hurt in the lead role. This adaptation removes the whistle of the original James story but hints at Robert Burns' original Scottish folk song "Oh, whistle and I'll come to you, my lad", which Hurt's character recites at the beginning of the story to his wife and is played over the end credits.

Plot
In this version, retired astronomer James Parkin goes on a respite holiday after leaving his aged wife (who appears to be in the advanced stages of dementia) in a care home. When revisiting one of their favourite coastal towns during the off-season, he goes for a walk on the beach and discovers a wedding ring in the sand, which he keeps. As he is walking back along the desolate beach to his hotel, he senses he is being followed and sees a motionless white-clad figure in the distance behind him. As he walks further, the seemingly motionless figure gets closer to him each time he turns to look back. Nervous, he runs back to the steps away from the beach but as he turns around again, the figure has disappeared. Back at his hotel room, he cleans the ring he has found and sees it is inscribed with the Latin words for "Who is this, who is coming?" which he reads out loud. Later that night, he is awoken by noises. Initially this seems to be caused by a storm outside but he then hears scratching noises inside his room. He goes back to sleep with his bedside lamp turned on but when he awakens again later, the lamp is off again.

The next morning, he dismisses the scratching noises as a rat and the lamp as having a loose connection, both of which he asks the hotel receptionist to investigate. He begins to venture out to the beach again but once he gets there he becomes hesitant and decides to spend the day elsewhere instead. That night, Parkin falls asleep while reading in bed. He is woken in the night again by strange noises and finds his bedside lamp is once again turned off even though he fell asleep with it on. This time, someone tries to enter his hotel room. Though they are unsuccessful, he feels shaken by the incident. Eventually, he manages to fall asleep again but has a disturbing dream that involves his wife, a young child and the figure on the beach.

Early the next morning, he tells the hotel receptionist that he believes one of the other guests tried to get into his room but she tells him that he was alone in the hotel, with no other guests or even staff present. Though his scientific mind refuses to acknowledge the existence of the spiritual or supernatural (he refuses to believe in the idea of his wife's spirit being trapped in her almost functionless body like a "ghost in the machine"), he becomes increasingly uneasy during the remainder of his stay at the hotel. Later that day, he is again followed by the ominous white-clad figure on the otherwise empty beach. Panicked, he runs back to the hotel and decides to leave the following day.

The night before he is due to depart, Parkin struggles to relax in his hotel room. He picks up the ring he found on the beach but quickly tries to dispel any irrational thoughts he is having and eventually falls asleep. Later in the night, he is once again awakened by the scratching sounds and then something trying to enter his hotel room. This time, an apparition enters his room from underneath the door. As his bedside lamp goes off again by itself, Parkin shuts his eyes in terror and implores the apparition to leave him alone. As he opens his eyes he sees a figure sitting on the end of his bed. The figure appears to be his wife, who angrily says over and over again "I'm still here" as she crawls towards him. Parkin tries in vain to escape, his fingernails scratching on the wooden floor making a sound identical to the scratching noises he kept hearing. The following morning, the receptionist finds Parkin lying dead in his bed, while his wife seemingly vanishes from the care home.

Cast
 John Hurt – James Parkin
 Gemma Jones – Alice Parkin
 Lesley Sharp – Hetty, the nurse
 Sophie Thompson – Carol, the hotel receptionist

Production
Various scenes were filmed at Kingsgate Bay and Botany Bay both in the Isle of Thanet, Kent, England.

Score
The music for this adaptation was composed by Tristin Norwell and Nick Green.

Reception
As it was shown on Christmas Eve, there were few reviews. Sam Wollaston, writing in The Guardian was mixed in his review, criticising some of the changes ("His terrifying short story has been much tampered with. The whistle...is missing mysteriously...Even the shoreline is wrong; it should be the east coast: dunes, windswept. This looks like Dorset."). He praised John Hurt's performance, calling it "a masterclass in how to captivate" and noting that despite the changes "what survives...is the spirit of the story – a man, alone by the sea, haunted, pursued by something. It is terrifying".

References

External links
 

Adaptations of works by M. R. James
British television films
Films based on short fiction
British horror films
A Ghost Story for Christmas